Capoeta anamisensis is a species of cyprinid in the genus Capoeta, native to Iran.

References

anamisensis
Fish described in 2016